The Prince and the Pirate is a 2001 film directed by and starring Leonardo Pieraccioni.

Plot
Leopoldo is a separate teacher and learns of his father's death. Once arrived at the morgue, however, the parent wakes up and says he just wants to pretend to be dead to escape from their creditors. The father escapes abroad and leaves to his son a videotape, from which emerges that Leopoldo has a secret brother who was born 35 years earlier by an extramarital affair with a janitor: Melchiorre called "Gimondi" who is serving several years in prison. The two brothers meet to sell his father's inheritance, and embark on a long car trip from Palermo to Saint Vincent.

Cast
Leonardo Pieraccioni as Leopoldo Natali
Massimo Ceccherini as Melchiorre Gimondi
Luisa Ranieri as Luisa
Melanie Gerren as Melanie
Giorgio Picchianti as Pierino
Claudio Angelini as Ubaldo
Lucio Allocca as Don Capece
Silvan as himself

References

External links
 

Italian comedy films
Films directed by Leonardo Pieraccioni
2000s Italian films